Artur Vititin (born 13 June 1997) is an Estonian Greco-Roman wrestler. He competed in the 2020 Summer Olympics held in Tokyo, Japan.

References

External links
 

1997 births
Living people
Estonian male sport wrestlers
Olympic wrestlers of Estonia
Wrestlers at the 2019 European Games
Wrestlers at the 2020 Summer Olympics
European Games competitors for Estonia